"Don't Marry Her" is a song by English pop rock group the Beautiful South and the opening track on their fifth studio album, Blue Is the Colour (1996). Vocalist Jacqui Abbott begs a man to run away with her from the woman he is going to marry and attempts to sway him by describing what she thinks married life with the other woman will be like, painting an uninviting picture. Released on 2 December 1996, the single peaked at number eight on the UK Singles Chart and was certified gold by the British Phonographic Industry.

Background
The song's lyrics were substantially altered for the release as a single – changing from "Don't marry her, fuck me" to "Don't marry her, have me", and with "sweaty bollocks" becoming "Sandra Bullocks". The song spent 10 weeks on the UK Singles Chart, peaking at number eight, and also charted within the lower reaches of several European charts. The single version appears on the best of album Solid Bronze: Great Hits, while Soup features the original album version.

Critical reception
A reviewer from Music Week rated the song three out of five, writing, "Some strong guitar riffs appear in this country-tinged follow up to their huge radio hit Rotterdam, but Jacqueline Abbot's vocal will be too saccharine for some ears."

Track listings

UK CD1
 "Don't Marry Her"
 "God Bless the Child"
 "Without Her"

UK CD2
 "Don't Marry Her"
 "Dream a Little Dream"
 "Les yeux ouverts"

UK cassette single
 "Don't Marry Her"
 "Dream a Little Dream"
 "God Bless the Child"

US 7-inch jukebox single
A. "Don't Marry Her" (clean version) – 3:22
B. "Mirror" – 4:05

Charts

Certifications

References

1996 singles
1996 songs
The Beautiful South songs
Go! Discs singles
Songs about infidelity
Songs about marriage
Songs written by David Rotheray
Songs written by Paul Heaton